= Tapton Mount School =

Defunct British school for the blind

Coordinates: 53.377°N 1.5075°W

Information
- Former names: Sheffield School for Blind Children; Sheffield School for the Blind
- Established: 1879
- Closed: 1997

Tapton Mount School, formerly Sheffield School for Blind Children, formerly Sheffield School for the Blind was a school for the visually impaired situated at 20 Manchester Road, Sheffield, South Yorkshire. It opened in 1879 at a cost of £15,000. In the 1960s and 1970s, the headmaster Frederick Tooze pioneered the integration of students into local comprehensive schools. It closed in 1997 after the pupil roll fell to twelve.

== Alumni ==
Former Home Secretary, David Blunkett, attended the school between 1952 and 1959. His time at the school is described in his 1995 book, On a Clear Day.
